Marie Gabrielle (9 October 1878 in Tegernsee, Bavaria –  24 October 1912 in Sorrento, Italy) Duchess in Bavaria, was the youngest daughter of Duke Karl Theodor in Bavaria and his second wife, Infanta Maria Josepha of Portugal. She married Prince Rupprecht of Bavaria in 1900 but died before he became Crown Prince. Through her second son Albrecht, Marie Gabrielle was the grandmother of the present Duke of Bavaria, Franz.

Biography

Family 
Her parents were ophthalmologist Karl Theodor, Duke in Bavaria, a member of the House of Wittelsbach and kinsman of the Kings of Bavaria, and his second wife, Princess Maria José of Bragança, a daughter of King Miguel I, exiled monarch of Portugal. Her paternal aunt was Empress Elisabeth of Austria (Sissi) and one of her sisters was Elisabeth in Bavaria, consort of Albert I of Belgium. Brought up mainly in Possenhofen Castle, she and her siblings had a happy childhood. She had an inclination for drawing, and in this was supported by her father.

Marriage 
On 10 July 1900 in Munich at the Allerheiligen-Hofkirche, Marie Gabriele married her second cousin once-removed, Prince Rupprecht of Bavaria. He was the eldest son of Prince Ludwig of Bavaria (later prince regent and King of Bavaria) and Maria Theresia of Austria-Este. The wedding was attended by Prince Joachim of Prussia, representing his father Emperor Wilhelm II. After their marriage, the couple settled down in Bamberg, Bavaria, where Rupprecht was head of an army corps. Their two eldest children were born there.

The couple traveled a great deal. For example, they journeyed to Japan and returned by way of the United States in 1903. The trip to Japan was scientific in nature, and the couple were accompanied by a renowned professor from the University of Munich. Marie Gabriele wrote home quite enthusiastically about their journey. Like her parents, she was a great lover of science and nature, as well as poetry and music.

While in Japan, Marie Gabriele became seriously ill. Upon their return to Bavaria, she underwent surgery for appendicitis. She made a full recovery.

Her husband Rupprecht became the heir apparent when his father became King of Bavaria in 1913, however, Marie Gabriele had died from renal failure the previous year and never became Crown Princess of Bavaria. Her husband later remarried, to her first cousin Princess Antoinette of Luxembourg, on April 7, 1921.

Marie Gabriele was interred at Theatinerkirche in Munich near her deceased children. Her only child to survive to adulthood was her second son Albrecht, who succeeded his father as the head of the House of Wittelsbach in 1955. His daughter was named after her.

Issue

Ancestry

References

External links 

1878 births
1912 deaths
House of Wittelsbach
Bavarian princesses
Deaths from kidney failure
Duchesses in Bavaria
Burials at the Theatine Church, Munich